Health Futures UTC is a University Technical College in West Bromwich, England. The UTC opened in 2015 and is sponsored by the University of Wolverhampton, West Midlands Ambulance Service and Midcounties Co-operative Pharmacy.

References

External links
 

University Technical Colleges
University of Wolverhampton
Secondary schools in Sandwell
Educational institutions established in 2015
2015 establishments in England